Jang Chang (born 21 June 1996) is a South Korean footballer who plays as a midfielder for Hyundai Steel Red Angels and the South Korea women's national team.

References

1996 births
Living people
South Korean women's footballers
Women's association football midfielders
South Korea women's under-17 international footballers
South Korea women's under-20 international footballers
South Korea women's international footballers
WK League players
Footballers at the 2018 Asian Games
Asian Games bronze medalists for South Korea
Asian Games medalists in football
Medalists at the 2018 Asian Games
Incheon Hyundai Steel Red Angels WFC players